Teisen classification is a system of categorizing fractures of the lunate bone, which is located in the hand.

Classification

References

Orthopedic classifications
Injuries of wrist and hand